Joseph Henry Thayer (November 7, 1828—November 26, 1901), an American biblical scholar, was born in Boston, Massachusetts.

Life
Joseph Henry Thayer was born in 1828 in Boston. He graduated from Harvard in 1850 and from Andover Theological Seminary in 1857. From 1858 to 1864 he served as a pastor—first in Quincy, Massachusetts, then in Salem—and served as a chaplain of the 40th Massachusetts Volunteers in the Civil War. After the war, he returned to Massachusetts to become Professor of Sacred Literature at Andover Theological Seminary, where he taught until 1882. In 1884, he began teaching New Testament criticism at Harvard. In 1870, Thayer was a member of the American Bible Revision Committee and recording secretary of the New Testament company (working on the Revised Version). 

Thayer's Greek–English Lexicon is a revised and translated edition of C.G. Wilke's Clavis Novi Testamenti - first published in 1841. After numerous revisions by both Wilke and his successor, C.L. Wilibald Grimm, Thayer took over the project. Thayer devoted nearly thirty years to the translation that first appeared in 1885, and updated edition in 1889. 

In February 1891 Thayer published a lecture in which he expressed disagreement with the position of Biblical inerrancy, asserting that his own acceptance of various errors of history and science in the Bible did not materially detract from his belief in the overall soundness of Christianity.

Thayer was president of the Society of Biblical Literature and Exegesis for 1894 and 1895. In his 1895 presidential address, he called for the creation of an "American School for Oriental Study and Research" in Palestine. 
Over the next five years, the Society was involved in the establishment of the American School of Oriental Research in Jerusalem. A plaque commemorating Thayer's role in its foundation was placed at the American School in 1933.

Notes

References

External links
Papers of Joseph Henry Thayer are in the Harvard Divinity School Library at Harvard Divinity School in Cambridge, Massachusetts.

1828 births
1901 deaths
American theologians
American religion academics
Boston Latin School alumni
Harvard Divinity School alumni
Union Army chaplains
Harvard Divinity School faculty
American biblical scholars
New Testament scholars
Scholars of Koine Greek
19th-century philologists
American philologists
American lexicographers
Translators of the Bible into English
19th-century translators
19th-century American clergy
19th-century lexicographers